The 2003–04 Vysshaya Liga season was the 12th season of the Vysshaya Liga, the second level of ice hockey in Russia. 30 teams participated in the league. Spartak Moscow and Molot-Prikamie Perm were promoted to the Russian Superleague.

First round

Western Conference

Eastern Conference

Playoffs

External links 
 Season on hockeyarchives.info
 Season on hockeyarchives.ru

2003–04 in Russian ice hockey leagues
Rus
Russian Major League seasons